Nguyễn Sơn (1 October 1908 – 21 October 1956), also known by his Chinese name Hong Shui, was a Vietnamese military leader who participated in the Chinese Communist Revolution and the First Indochina War against the French. Sơn spent much of his early years in China, and was one of the few Vietnamese who had participated in and survived the Long March with the Chinese Communist Party. He was awarded the rank of Major General in both the Vietnam People's Army and the Chinese People's Liberation Army.

He married Lê Hằng Huân, a daughter of the writer Lê Dư, his sisters-in-law being Lê Hằng Phương wife of the writer Vũ Ngọc Phan, and Lê Hằng Phấn wife of the writer Hoàng Văn Chí.

Early life
Nguyễn Sơn was born on 1 October 1908 in Gia Lâm District in Hanoi. He was the son of Vũ Trường Xương. When he was five years old he began to learn French at a Catholic school in Hanoi. When Sơn was fourteen years old he passed the Hanoi Teachers College. He often organizes students from the School of Education and the Guardian School to fight against Westerners in other schools. His parents married him to Nguyễn Thị Giệm  four years older than him. He pretended to drink alcohol to causing trouble with his father-in-law and to get rid of his older wife.

Nguyễn was sent to study in France, where he met Ho Chi Minh. At the end of 1924, Nguyễn, Hoàng Văn Hoan, Phạm Văn Đồng and more than 30 Vietnamese revolutionary youths, followed Ho Chi Minh to Guangzhou. In March 1926, Nguyễn was introduced by Li Fuchun, Cai Chang, Lin Biao, Liu Zhidan and others at the Whampoa Military Academy. At the academy, he was introduced to Chen Yimin and joined the Communist Party of China. After graduating in October 1926, Nguyễn followed Ho Chi Minh's instructions and continued to work at the Whampoa Military Academy, and joined the Chinese Kuomintang.

Revolutionary career
On 12 April 1927, Chiang Kai-shek carried out a purge of thousands of suspected Communists and dissidents in Shanghai, and began large-scale massacres across the country collectively known as the "White Terror". In response, Nguyễn left the Kuomintang and officially joined the Communist Party of China in August 1927. In December 1927, he participated in the Guangzhou Uprising, and after its failure fled to Hong Kong. With the consent of Ye Jianying and Nie Rongzhen, Nguyễn and Ho Chi Minh went to Thailand in order to organize overseas Vietnamese to join the revolution.

In 1928, he returned to China and joined the People's Liberation Army. In 1929, he held the position of company political commissar in the 47th Regiment, and commanded the company in battles near Dong River. During this time, he adopted the name Hong Shui.

He was the only foreign officer in the People's Liberation Army. He served as the regimental commissar, and political director of the 34th Division of the Chinese Red Army's 12th Army. Due to his rich practical experience and theoretical background, he was assigned to teach at the newly established Central Military Political School of the Red Army in Ruijin, Jiangxi Province. At the end of 1932, he also participated in the establishment of the first troupe of the Red Army, and later became leader of the troupe.

In January 1934, at the Second National Congress of Delegates of the Chinese Soviet Republic, Nguyễn was elected a member of the Central Committee of the Communist Party of China and as an ethnic minority representative. Because the leftist line prevailed in the Communist Party of China, during the period 1933 to 1938, he was expelled from the Communist Party of China three times, only to have his membership restored.

In October 1934, he participated in the Long March, a military retreat undertaken by the Red Army to evade the pursuit of the Kuomintang army. During this time, he was falsely accused by Zhang Guotao of being a spy and was expelled from the CCP. He was sentenced to be executed, but was saved due to intervention from Zhu De and Liu Bocheng. The march traversed over 9,000 kilometres (5,600 mi) over 370 days from Jiangxi to Shaanxi Province and Nguyễn was the only Vietnamese to have successfully completed the march.

In December 1935, he returned to Yan'an after being lost for many days. He was later admitted to Chinese Red Army University, where in listened to the lectures by Mao Zedong and Zhou Enlai.

In July 1937, at the beginning of the Second Sino-Japanese War, he followed Commander-in-Chief of PLA Zhu De and the 115th Division across the Yellow River to Shanxi Province to establish an anti-Japanese base at the Wutai Mountains. He was appointed Party Secretary of Dongye District and Head of the Propaganda Department of the Northeast Shanxi Party Committee.

References

1908 births
1956 deaths
Vietnamese emigrants to China
People's Liberation Army generals
Generals of the People's Army of Vietnam
Vietnamese communists
Chinese communists
People from Hanoi
People from Bắc Ninh province
Recipients of the Order of Ho Chi Minh
Deaths from stomach cancer
Deaths from cancer in Vietnam